Mount Ketra is one of the mountains located in Datar  Village, Dayeuhluhur District, Cilacap Regency, Indonesia. 

The location and shape of Mount Ketra although not
too high but quite striking and in
contrast to the surrounding area,
especially the area of Dayeuhluhur.
Because of its location surrounded by
settlements, since ancient times since
the Great Power region was inhabited by
humans, Mount Ketra has been used as
a "ciciren" or a sign to find out the
location of human habitation around it.
The name Mount Ketra before the
existence of Ketra Overtime was
recognized by the ancient Galuh
community as Puntang Mountain. It is
said that based on the story of Batu Nilu
that those who want to take control of
the Gunung Ketra or Daya Luhur region
must be brave first "nangtungan" on this
mountain. This mountain is an important
place in the life of the Daya Luhur
community. Therefore the existence of
Mount Ketra since ancient times is one
of the places sacred by the Dayeuhluhur
community.

References

GUNUNG Ketra di Desa Datar, Kecamatan
Dayeuhluh, Kabupaten Cilacap penuh
misteri dan menyimpan sejarah masa
Kerajaan Sunda, Mataram, hingga
Jayakarta.https://satelitpost.com/beritautama/kini-kekayaan-ki-jaketra-tak-lagi-berbekas

Cilacap Regency